Michael Fidel Guevara Legua (born 10 June 1984 in Lima) is a Peruvian former footballer who used to play as an attacking midfielder for Once Caldas in the Categoría Primera A. He was included for one minute in the Peru national football team led by Sergio Markarián, and helped his team finish third in the Copa America, Argentina 2011.

Club career
Guevara developed as footballer in the youth academy of Peruvian giants Universitario de Deportes. He was promoted to their first team in July 2002.

International career
Guevara made his senior debut for the Peruvian national team on February 8, 2011, in a friendly against Panama. Debuting in Moquegua, manager Sergio Markarian put him in the starting eleven and later replaced him in the 46th minute for Carlos Lobatón as the match finished 1–0 for Peru.

References

External links 

 

1984 births
Living people
Footballers from Lima
Peruvian footballers
Peru international footballers
Club Universitario de Deportes footballers
Unión Huaral footballers
Sport Boys footballers
Juan Aurich footballers
Club Deportivo Universidad César Vallejo footballers
Colegio Nacional Iquitos footballers
Jagiellonia Białystok players
Club Deportivo Universidad de San Martín de Porres players
Once Caldas footballers
Peruvian Primera División players
Ekstraklasa players
Categoría Primera A players
Peruvian expatriate footballers
Peruvian expatriate sportspeople in Poland
Expatriate footballers in Poland
Peruvian expatriate sportspeople in Colombia
Expatriate footballers in Colombia
Association football midfielders
Association football utility players
2011 Copa América players